The Wyoming Public Service Commission is a public utilities commission, a quasi-judicial tribunal, which regulates natural gas, electric, telecommunications, water, and pipeline services in the U.S. state of Wyoming.

Commission members

Mary A. Throne, Chairman
Chris B. Petrie, Deputy Chairman
Mike M. Robinson, Commissioner

See also
 Public Utilities Commission

References

External links
 Official site

Wyoming
State agencies of Wyoming